Major General (retd) Milinda Peiris RWP RSP USP VSV LOM ndc psc was the Chief of Staff of the Sri Lanka Army. Major General Milinda was appointed as Vice Chancellor (VC) of the General Sir John Kotelawala Defence University (KDU) on January 16, 2020 for second occasion. Milinda's previous tenure as Vice Chancellor of KDU from December 2008 to February 2016. 

He is also the Vice Chancellor / Commandant of the General Sir John Kotelawala Defence University (KDU). Major General Peiris also commanded the 5th Regiment of the Sri Lanka Armoured Corps with distinction.

Presently he serves as the CEO / Vice Chancellor at Saegis Campus, Sri Lanka. Other than that HE the President has appointed Major General Peiris as a member of the Advisory Council of the Institute of National Security Studies, Sri Lanka (INSSSL)

Education

Milinda received his education from Nalanda College, Colombo and was a Senior Cadet and Scout at school. Some of his contemporaries at Nalanda are Air Marshal Gagan Bulathsinghala, Major General Ubaya Madawela, Major General Janaka Walgama, Consultant Neurologist Udaya Ranawaka & former Sri Lanka test cricketer Sanath Kaluperuma.

Sri Lanka Scout Association
Major General Milinda Peiris is also serving as the Chief Commissioner of Sri Lanka Scout Association.

References

 

 

 
 COLONEL COMMANDANT OF THE REGIMENT - Sri Lanka Armoured Corps
 RENOVATED KANDAWALA LAKE DECLARED OPEN BY THE CHIEF OF DEFENCE STAFF
 American strategist Patrick Mendis Honored by the Sri Lanka Defense University
 Sri Lanka: the ICRC and the Defence University train the military in IHL
 KDU Vice Chancellor's Contribution to Change in Global Education Awarded in Mumbai
 Two-Day International Symposium at KDU Inaugurated
 KDU signs MOU with Ruhuna for training of medical cadets
 SLPA, KDU partner for Diploma in Port Security

 

Sri Lankan Buddhists
Sri Lankan major generals
Sinhalese military personnel
Sri Lankan military attachés
Alumni of Nalanda College, Colombo
Sri Lanka Military Academy graduates
Commanders of the Legion of Merit
Foreign recipients of the Legion of Merit
Living people
Sri Lanka Armoured Corps officers
Commandants of the General Sir John Kotelawala Defence University
Year of birth missing (living people)